Neve Shalom (also spelt Neveh Shalom in some cases) may refer to:

Places 
 Neve Shalom – Wāħat as-Salām, a cooperative village in Israel
 Neve Shalom (neighborhood) and street, est. 1890 as a suburb of Jaffa, now part of Neve Tzedek neighbourhood in Tel Aviv-Yafo

Synagogues 
 The Neve Shalom Synagogue in Istanbul
 The Neveh Shalom Synagogue in Paramaribo
 The Neveh Shalom Synagogue (Portland, Oregon)